KTGM (channel 14) is a television station in Tamuning, Guam, serving the U.S. territory as an affiliate of ABC. It is owned by Sorensen Media Group alongside low-power Fox affiliate KEQI-LD (channel 22). The two stations share studios on 111 Chalan Santo Papa in Hagåtña (Agana); KTGM's transmitter is located in the heights of Barigåda (Barrigada).

History 
KTGM signed on the air in 1987, broadcasting on NTSC analog channel 14. It was Guam's second commercial TV station after KUAM-TV had signed on 31 years prior, and the first TV station of any kind on Guam in nearly 17 years since PBS member KGTF's sign on. It has always been a primary ABC affiliate, but in the beginning also had a secondary CBS affiliation, which it shared with KUAM-TV. It added Fox programming in 1990, after being dropped by KUAM-TV. CBS was dropped in 1995 after KUAM-LP signed on. Fox was dropped as well by the end of the 1990s, shifting its focus to ABC programming, after which Fox was only available on cable via San Francisco Bay Area affiliate KTVU until 2005, when KEQI-LP picked up the affiliation. Between June 2001 and November 2005, KTGM also carried WB programming (previously carried by KUAM-LP).

KTGM used to be located on the third floor of the Atlantica Building at 692 North Marine Drive (now known as Marine Corps Drive) in Upper Tumon (Municipality of Tamuning). Due to the building's ownership issues, KTGM moved to a commercial building on Route 16 (now known as Army Drive) in Barrigada Heights in 2003.

In 2001, the station also launched a repeater, KPPI-LP, in Garapan, Saipan, Northern Marianas Islands, on VHF channel 7. The station started off as K07XG (November 19, 2001 – December 17, 2004), before gaining the callsign of KPPI-LP (December 17, 2004 – March 28, 2005).  It was deleted for three days (as DKPPI-LP, from March 28 to March 31, 2005), before being reinstated as KPPI-LP on March 31, 2005. It is the first and only broadcast station in Saipan since the shutdown of WSZE in 1980. The station was licensed for digital operation as KPPI-LD on VHF channel 7 effective March 21, 2022.

Originally owned and operated by Island Broadcasting, Inc., KTGM was purchased by Sorensen Media Group (then owner of five radio stations on Guam and Saipan, and now additionally three TV stations) in November 2005. Soon after, it moved its cable channel position from 14 to 7, hence the current station branding. In 2009, Sorensen moved the station's facilities, along with its sister stations, from Barrigada Heights to Hagåtña.

In 2008, KTGM apparently had its DTV construction permit expire, and was waiting for the FCC to reinstate it, which it did later that year. On February 18, 2009, KTGM officially signed off its analog channel at 2 p.m. Chamorro Standard Time (6 p.m. HST/8 p.m. PST/11 p.m. EST on February 17, 2009) and switched on its ATSC digital channel 14.

Programming and schedule 

Because Guam is a day ahead of the continental United States and that most programs arrived by tapes from California, KTGM used to air most ABC shows (except those available through satellites) on a one-week delay basis. When KTGM carried WB programming, it was aired from 6 to 8 p.m. directly before ABC's primetime schedule, also on a one-week delay.

With advancing communication technology, KTGM now airs the complete ABC lineup on the "same day" (just a few hours behind Hawaii), meaning that a Monday through Sunday stateside pattern is aired on a Tuesday through Monday pattern on Guam due to the time zone and day-ahead hindrance. ABC's sports programs are aired with less delay, and often in the middle of the night, Guam time; some sporting events that air live in primetime often air in the late-morning hours in Guam—one example was Monday Night Football which, when it was on ABC, aired on Tuesdays at 11 a.m. in Guam.

KTGM's syndicated programming includes Entertainment Tonight and Inside Edition. These same programs are also repeated on KEQI-LD.

In 2005, KTGM began airing repeats of their ABC children's and primetime shows (like Ugly Betty) during the week after their original airings, which made them the only ABC affiliate to hold this unique programming distinction. It was discontinued in 2009.

News and weather 
KTGM broadcast hourly weather segments from what it dubbed the "ABC14 WeatherCenter" between January 1999 and December 2002. (It was never revived after Super Typhoon Pongsona.)

The merger with Sorensen allowed KTGM to share resources with Sorensen's radio stations, and thus allowed the K57 (KGUM) news operations (which took on the name "Pacific News Center") to expand into television. KTGM's half-hour evening news began broadcasting in summer 2005, ending KUAM's monopoly of local TV news since 1998. The PNC TV news is broadcast live nightly at 6 p.m., then rebroadcast on KEQI-LD at 7 and 10:30 p.m., as well as on KTGM after ABC primetime programming at 10 p.m.

See also
Channel 7 branded TV stations in the United States
Channel 14 digital TV stations in the United States
Channel 14 virtual TV stations in the United States

References

External links 
KTGM - ABC 7 Guam & Saipan
PNC News First

TGM
ABC network affiliates
Television channels and stations established in 1987
1987 establishments in Guam